Mount Henry is a sharp peak rising to  in the Commonwealth Range, Antarctica, standing  southeast of Mount Kyffin on the east side of Beardmore Glacier. It was discovered and named by the British Antarctic Expedition, 1907–09.

References

Mountains of the Ross Dependency
Dufek Coast